Killer on the Rampage is the sixth studio album by Eddy Grant. It remains his most successful album, hitting the top 10 in the US and the UK. It features the hits "Electric Avenue" (which was a big hit in the US and UK at #2), "I Don't Wanna Dance" (a UK #1 hit) and "War Party".

Track listing
All songs written and arranged by Eddy Grant. 
 "Electric Avenue" – 3:48
 "I Don't Wanna Dance" – 3:40
 "It's All in You" – 4:26
 "War Party" – 3:54
 "Funky Rock 'N' Roll" – 4:30
 "Too Young to Fall" – 4:28
 "Latin Love Affair" – 4:18
 "Another Revolutionary" – 5:16
 "Drop Baby Drop" – 3:33
 "Killer on the Rampage" – 3:29

Bonus tracks on deluxe edition
 "Electric Avenue" (Extended Version) 6:18
 "I Don't Wanna Dance" (Extended Version) 5:41
 "War Party" (Bajan Remix Extended Version) 8:28

Personnel
Technical
 Frank Aggarat - engineer
 Tim "TimTom" Young - mastering
 Simon Fowler - photography

Charts

Weekly charts

Year-end charts

References

1982 albums
Eddy Grant albums
Portrait Records albums